Pete Sampras defeated Andre Agassi in the final, 6–3, 6–4, 5–7, 6–4 to win the men's singles tennis title at the 2002 US Open. It was his record-extending 14th major title. The final was also a rematch of the 1990 and 1995 US Open finals, where Sampras won his first and seventh major titles respectively. It was Sampras' last professional appearance, though he did not officially declare his retirement until 2003. Sampras became the only man in the Open Era to win the final major he played.

Lleyton Hewitt was the defending champion, but lost to Agassi in the semifinals.

This marked the most recent occasion where eight different men appeared in the four major singles finals of a calendar year.

Seeds

Draw

Finals

Top half

Section 1

Section 2

Section 3

Section 4

Bottom half

Section 5

Section 6

Section 7

Section 8

Other entry information

Wild cards

Protected ranking

Qualifiers

Lucky losers

Withdrawals

Notes

External links
 Association of Tennis Professionals (ATP) – 2002 US Open Men's Singles draw
2002 US Open – Men's draws and results at the International Tennis Federation

2002 US Open (tennis)
US Open (tennis) by year – Men's singles